"Comfort in Sound" is the last single to be taken from Feeder's 2002 album of the same name. It was only available at first on the band's arena tour in December 2003, and was limited to 3,000 copies. A few weeks after the tour, the single was available for download from "Feederweb" with downloadable PDF artwork.

The inclusion of the original "Piece by Piece" video was the first time it was ever released in the UK.

It made the B-list of BBC Radio 1's playlist – the first time for a download-only single in which the CD was not commercially available or not available at all.

Release
After the release of "Find the Colour", which was the band's last commercial single from the album, the band released the title track as a limited edition single, only available during the 2003 Comfort in Sound tour.

Music video
The music video features various montages in black and white from the band's shows over the years; it is the last time to date the band's late drummer Jon Lee appears in a music video, and the first time for touring guitarist Dean Tidey, who would later re-appear in the video for "Pushing the Senses", which used a similar format.

The various montages are from the 2001 and 2002 Reading festivals, various dates on the March–April 2003 tour and previously unreleased rehearsal footage. Each scene uses fade-in-out techniques, to follow onto the next one.

Reception
The single reached number 8 on the international artist airplay chart in the UAE, and also the top 10 of the weekly "X-List" voting chart on XFM. It was also at the time the highest charting download-only single on the UK top 100 radio airplay charts, when it reached number 57.

Track listing

CD

"Comfort in Sound" (Mike "Spike" Stent remix) - 3:38
"Comfort in Sound" (video)
"Piece by Piece" (original video)

2003 singles
Feeder songs
2002 songs
The Echo Label singles
Songs written by Grant Nicholas